Daventry is a constituency in Northamptonshire represented in the House of Commons of the UK Parliament since 2010 by Chris Heaton-Harris of the Conservative Party, who has served as Secretary of State for Northern Ireland since 2022.

History
The seat, one of many created in 1918, was a narrower form of the oldest creation of South Northamptonshire and lasted 32 years until it reverted into "South Northamptonshire".  Finally today's seat was recreated mostly from the north of the South Northants seat in 1974.  Since its recreation and during its first existence it has been served by Conservative MPs.  As the 1997 majority was also not marginal, it has been to date an archetypal safe seat.

Boundaries 

1918–1950: The Boroughs of Daventry and Brackley, the Rural Districts of Brackley, Crick, Daventry, Hardingstone, Middleton Cheney, Potterspury, and Towcester, and part of the Rural District of Northampton.

1974–1983: The Boroughs of Brackley and Daventry, and the Rural Districts of Brackley, Brixworth, Daventry, Northampton, and Towcester.

1983–1997: The District of Daventry wards of Abbey North, Abbey South, Badby, Barby, Brampton, Braunston, Byfield, Crick and West Haddon, Drayton, Everdon, Flore, Guilsborough, Hill, Kilsby, Long Buckby, Ravensthorpe, Spratton, Weedon, Welford, Woodford, and Yelvertoft, and the District of South Northamptonshire wards of Astwell, Blakesley, Brackley East, Brackley West, Cosgrove, Danvers, Deanshanger, Forest, Grafton, Greatworth, King's Sutton, Kingthorn, Middleton Cheney, Potterspury, Rainsborough, Slapton, Tove, Towcester, and Wardoun.

1997–2010: The District of Daventry wards of Abbey North, Abbey South, Badby, Barby, Brampton, Braunston, Byfield, Crick and West Haddon, Drayton, Everdon, Flore, Hill, Kilsby, Long Buckby, Ravensthorpe, Weedon, Woodford, and Yelvertoft, and the District of South Northamptonshire wards of Astwell, Blakesley, Blisworth, Brackley East, Brackley West, Bugbrooke, Cosgrove, Danvers, Deanshanger, Forest, Gayton, Grafton, Greatworth, Heyford, King's Sutton, Kingthorn, Middleton Cheney, Potterspury, Rainsborough, Slapton, Tove, Towcester, and Wardoun.

2010–present: The District of Daventry, the District of South Northamptonshire wards of Cote, Downs, Grange, Harpole, and Heyford, and the Borough of Wellingborough wards of Earls Barton and West.

The constituency covers the west of Northamptonshire and is named for the market town of Daventry. It covers the western part of Daventry and South Northamptonshire local government districts.

Members of Parliament

MPs 1918–1950

MPs since Feb 1974

Elections

Elections in the 2010s

UKIP originally selected Nigel Wickens, who was also selected for Mid Bedfordshire.

After the 2005 general election, Daventry incurred massive boundary changes following the creation of the new South Northamptonshire seat. The results of the 2010 general election are based on the notional results for the new boundaries.

Elections in the 2000s

Elections in the 1990s

Elections in the 1980s

Elections in the 1970s

Elections in the 1940s

General Election 1939–40:

Another General Election was required to take place before the end of 1940. The political parties had been making preparations for an election to take place from 1939 and by the end of this year, the following candidates had been selected; 
Speaker: Edward FitzRoy
Labour: Paul F Williams

Elections in the 1930s

Elections in the 1920s

Elections in the 1910s

Notes

References

See also 
List of parliamentary constituencies in Northamptonshire

Parliamentary constituencies in Northamptonshire
Constituencies of the Parliament of the United Kingdom disestablished in 1950
Constituencies of the Parliament of the United Kingdom established in 1918
Constituencies of the Parliament of the United Kingdom established in 1974